Josettante Hero is a 2012 Malayalam film directed by K. K. Haridas, starring Anoop Menon and Kriti Kapoor in the lead roles.The film was box office bomb.

Plot
The film tells a story with movie-making as the backdrop. Vijayaraghavan appears as the title character of Josettan, who is a senior film producer. Anoop Menon comes up as Saajan Malyath, the still photographer of the film who is accidentally selected to become the hero of the new film in production.

Cast

Anoop Menon as Sajan
Kriti Kapoor as Haritha
Vijayaraghavan as Jose
Bheeman Raghu as Vijayan Pattikara
Zeenath as Annie Jose
Kochu Preman as Sreedharan Parasala
Ashokan as Raviprakash 
Sudheesh as Kuchelan
Suraj Venjaramoodu as T.T Kuruvilla
Kalabhavan Shajohn as Chandran
Janardhanan as K.P Paniker
Shivaji Guruvayoor as Rahul Krishnadas
Kalabhavan Rahman as Shukkor
Dimple Rose as Leena Jose,Jose's daughter 
Fathima Babu
Andhu 
Kripa
Harisanth Saran -cameo appearance 
K. K. Haridas -cameo appearance
Salim Bava - cameo appearance

Reception

Critical reception
The film received negative reviews upon release.
 Times of India rated the film 1 out of 5 stars, saying that "It shows how a film, no matter how nicely conceived, can run out of control for want of craft."
 Rediff.com also rated the film 1 out of 5 star and criticised that "there is little to say about this film other than it does not seem to be deserving of your time."
 Sify.com rated the film as avoidable and also said that "Josettante Hero will find a place among the worst films released during recent times."
 Nowrunning.com rated the film 1/5 and said "a film that attempts to take a satirical look at the industry, but which in the process ends up making even a great mockery of itself."
 TheaterBalcony.com rated film 1.5/5 and said "At the end film failed to give the real content even after having a great concept. A group of talents were just wasted in this movie. Josettente Hero has no intention to entertain the audience."

Box Office
The film received negative reviews upon release and commercially flopp at the box office.

References

External links
 

2010s Malayalam-language films
Films about films
Films directed by K. K. Haridas